Mario Sampirisi (born 31 October 1992) is an Italian professional footballer who plays as a full-back for  club Frosinone, on loan from Monza.

Club career

Genoa
On 30 August 2011, Sampirisi joined Genoa in a 4-year contract. He was exchanged with Pelé. Half of Sampirisi's registration rights was "valued" €1,000,000 and Pelé for €950,000. Samprisi made his Serie A debut for Genoa on 22 January 2012 in a game against Palermo when he came on as a substitute in the 45th minute for Juraj Kucka. In June 2012, AC Milan signed Pelé (€900,000) and Chinellato outright (€1,750,000); while Genoa acquired Nicola Pasini (€1,650,000) and Sampirisi outright (€1,000,000). Circa 2012 he signed a new 4-year contract with Genoa (last until 30 June 2016).

In January 2013 he was signed by Chievo.

In January 2014 he was signed by Olhanense.

Vicenza
On 14 September 2014, he was signed by Serie B newcomer Vicenza in a temporary deal. He scored an own goal in the return leg of the semi-finals of the promotion playoffs. On 10 July 2015 Vicenza re-signed Sampirisi in a temporary deal, with an obligation to sign him outright.

Crotone
In July 2016, Sampirisi was signed by Crotone on a free transfer.

Monza
In July 2019, Sampirisi was signed by Monza on a free transfer. On 15 December 2020, Sampirisi scored a brace in the Serie B against Virtus Entella, helping Monza win 5–0. He was subbed on in the 80th minute, scoring a first-touch long-range goal in the 82nd minute, and another in the 90th minute. His two goals were his first in the competition.

Sampirisi helped Monza gain promotion to the Serie A for the first time as their captain in 2021–22. He played 77 games and scored six goals, and was key to helping Monza gain promotions to the Serie B and Serie A.

Loan to Frosinone 
On 24 August 2022, Sampirisi was loaned to Serie B club Frosinone.

International career
Samprisi played for Italy internationally at under-19, under-20, and under-21 levels.

Career statistics

Club

Honours 
Monza
 Serie C Group A: 2019–20

References

1992 births
Living people
People from Caltagirone
Sportspeople from the Province of Catania
Footballers from Sicily
Italian footballers
Association football fullbacks
A.C. Milan players
Genoa C.F.C. players
A.C. ChievoVerona players
S.C. Olhanense players
L.R. Vicenza players
F.C. Crotone players
A.C. Monza players
Frosinone Calcio players
Serie A players
Primeira Liga players
Serie B players
Serie C players
Italy under-21 international footballers
Italy youth international footballers
Italian expatriate footballers
Italian expatriate sportspeople in Portugal
Expatriate footballers in Portugal